Intrigue or The Martyrium is a 1920 German silent drama film directed by Paul L. Stein and starring Pola Negri and Eduard von Winterstein.

Cast
In alphabetical order
 Pola Negri as Gattin
 Eduard von Winterstein as Der Gatte, ein Aristokrat
 Ernst Hofmann as Verliebter Neffe
 Hans Kuhnert as Silvio de Montebello
 Frieda Lemke as Lisa
 Hermann Pfanz as Giovanni Basso, Schloßverwalter
 Ernst Stahl-Nachbaur as Luigi Paoli, Sekretär des Marchese

References

Bibliography
 Mariusz Kotowski. Pola Negri: Hollywood's First Femme Fatale. University Press of Kentucky, 2014.

External links

1920 films
Films of the Weimar Republic
German silent feature films
Films directed by Paul L. Stein
German black-and-white films
Films set in Italy
UFA GmbH films
German drama films
1920 drama films
Silent drama films
1920s German films
1920s German-language films